The Pitchfork Music Festival 2019 was held on July 19 to 21, 2019 at the Union Park, Chicago, United States. The festival was headlined by Haim, the Isley Brothers and Robyn.

Lineup
Headline performers are listed in boldface. Artists listed from latest to earliest set times.

Notes

References

External links

2019 music festivals
Pitchfork Music Festival